John Henry Gilmore, Jr. (born September 21, 1979) is a former American football tight end in the National Football League. He was drafted by the New Orleans Saints in the sixth round of the 2002 NFL Draft. He played college football at Penn State.

Gilmore also played for the Chicago Bears, Tampa Bay Buccaneers and Pittsburgh Steelers. Gilmore now serves as the founder and executive director for Brandthumb Consulting Agency.

Early years
Gilmore went to Wilson High School in West Lawn, Pennsylvania and was voted Wilson's 1996 male athlete of the year, Associated Press first-team All-State, and first-team all county (Berks).

Personal
John Gilmore is widely known for his deep commitment to community support.  Gilmore and his wife, Rebecca, reside in Tampa, Florida with their children Grayson and Lilliana.

He is represented by fellow Penn State alumnus Chafie Fields.

Gilmore earned a Bachelor of Science in recreation and parks management in 2001.

In 2010 Gilmore established the Gilmore | Henne Community Fund with Kansas City Chiefs quarterback, and fellow Wilson High School grad, Chad Henne. The Fund's mission is to revitalize parks and recreational facilities in their native Berks County, Pennsylvania. This is done through renovation, ongoing maintenance and park programming. The Fund's vision is to revitalize communities through their work on the playground. Since inception, the Fund has revitalized 7 playgrounds in Berks County.

References

External links
Tampa Bay Buccaneers bio page
"Volunteers surprised by presence of a Saint," Becca Gregg, Reading Eagle, November 21, 2011.

1979 births
Living people
People from Marquette, Michigan
American football tight ends
Players of American football from Pennsylvania
Penn State Nittany Lions football players
New Orleans Saints players
Chicago Bears players
Tampa Bay Buccaneers players
Pittsburgh Steelers players